Shironotani-ike Dam is an earthfill dam located in Ehime Prefecture in Japan. The dam is used for irrigation. The catchment area of the dam is 2.1 km2. The dam impounds about 3  ha of land when full and can store 287 thousand cubic meters of water. The construction of the dam was completed in 1953.

References

Dams in Ehime Prefecture
1953 establishments in Japan